Venice Boulevard is a major east–west thoroughfare in Los Angeles, running from the ocean in the Venice district, past the I-10 intersection, into downtown Los Angeles. It was originally known as West 16th Street under the Los Angeles numbered street system.

Route description
The western terminus of Venice Boulevard is Ocean Front Walk in Venice. Proceeding easterly, it assumes the designation California State Route 187 crossing Lincoln Boulevard (State Route 1). The route then passes through the Mar Vista neighborhood. Further east, it  briefly forms the boundary between Palms and Culver City and passes near Sony Pictures Studios. Continuing northeast into the Crestview neighborhood in West Los Angeles, the SR 187 designation terminates at the intersection with Cadillac Avenue and the ramp carrying traffic from westbound I-10. Continuing to parallel  Washington Boulevard directly to its south, as it does for much of its length, the route proceeds between the Picfair Village neighborhood in West Los Angeles and Lafayette Square in Mid-City, through the Mid-Wilshire district, through Arlington Heights and Harvard Heights, dips under the Harbor Freeway, and continues into the heart of downtown Los Angeles, where it turns into East 16th Street at Main Street.

History

A street railway was built on 16th Street by the Los Angeles Traction Company in 1896. An extra rail was installed in 1905, which created a dual-gauge streetcar thoroughfare which was shared with the Los Angeles Railway. The line eventually came under the control of the Pacific Electric Railway, which operated it until the end of 1950. The Venice Boulevard Local ran regular service to Vineyard Junction, while the Venice Short Line ran the length of Venice Boulevard from Pacific Avenue to Hill Street. The narrow gauge Los Angeles Railway A Line ran on Venice between Hill and Burlington Avenue until 1946.

Prior to 1932, West 16th Street ended at Crenshaw Boulevard. In that year part of the Pacific Electric right of way was taken and Venice Boulevard was cut through from La Brea Avenue to Crenshaw. At that time West 16th Street was renamed Venice Boulevard.

Public transportation
Metro Local line 33 operates on Venice Boulevard. The Metro E Line serves a rail station at its intersection with Robertson Boulevard.

Landmarks

 Venice High School is located near the intersection with Walgrove Avenue.
 Loyola High School is located by Venice and Vermont Avenue.
 The Angelus-Rosedale Cemetery also lies on Venice.

See also
Pico/Rimpau

References

External links

Streets in Los Angeles
Streets in Los Angeles County, California
Boulevards in the United States
Central Los Angeles
Culver City, California
Mar Vista, Los Angeles
Venice, Los Angeles
Westside (Los Angeles County)
West Los Angeles

pl:Venice Boulevard